Monster X Strikes Back: Attack the G8 Summit ( Girara no Gyakushū: Tōyako Samitto Kiki Ippatsu lit. Guilala's Counterattack: Lake Toya Summit Crisis) is a 2008 Japanese kaiju comedy film, released by Shochiku and produced by the Guilala Production Committee.

Plot
In the year 2008, all the world leaders are together at a G8 Summit meeting in Japan. A meteorite crashes into the heart of Sapporo and releases the monster Guilala. The monster rampages through Sapporo, leaving death and destruction in his wake. After leveling the city, Guilala transforms into a giant ball of fire and flies across Hokkaidō, making its way to the G8 Summit. The Prime Minister of Japan proposes cancelling the summit for the safety of all involved, but the President of the United States convinces the other world leaders to personally stay and fight. Shortly after forming a world alliance, each leader stays to fight for their own reasons:

United States - To boost his ratings in the polls.
France - To make a move on a pretty Japanese interpreter.
Great Britain - To assist their ally, the United States.
Germany - To put an end to sexism by the German Parliament.
Canada - To accompany the German leader for her safety.
Italy - Believes that Ancient Roman philosophies will stop Guilala.
Russia - Feels left out by the group and because Russia is close to Japan (where Guilala might head for next.)
Japan - Joins the group majority agreeing to stop Guilala.

The leaders soon discover the reason for Guilala's appearance on Earth was due to a Chinese satellite that fell out of orbit and was the crashed "meteorite" in Sapporo. Assisting the leaders is Dr. Sano, a Japanese scientist who discovers that Guilala is actually a cosmic spore attached to the probe that was exposed to Earth's atmosphere, causing it to grow into the monster. He also figures out that the crash caused Guilala to lose a lot of energy and it is searching for "high temperature" energy to recharge. The doctor does not think the monster will leave Japan until it finds the energy it needs. Meanwhile, Guilala arrives at the Noboribetsu power plant and sucks all of the energy out of the plant.

Hoping to trap Guilala, the Japanese set up an earthquake generator near Shōwa-shinzan to draw Guilala to a magma flow and destroy him with a super missile known as the Vulture. Guilala arrives to feed, but he swallows the missile whole when it is fired at him. Soon, other countries are scrambling with their own "super" weapons, but each one fails in comedic fashion. In the middle of all this, the Japanese Prime Minister is waylaid by diarrhea and is replaced by Junzaburo Ohizumi, a former Prime Minister and a friend of the U.S. President. He arrives to help in the battle, but seems shifty. Ohizumi even suggests using nuclear weapons, but is stared down by the other leaders.

When Guilala's mind is damaged by a British brainwashing weapon, the monster begins a wild rampage. Ohizumi suddenly reveals that he is in fact the Supreme leader of the "North Country" (North Korea's Kim Jong-Il). He stole Ohizumi's identity during a state visit. He reveals that the Japanese interpreters attending the G8 Summit are all his spies and they all draw weapons, taking the world leaders hostage. He also announces that he plans on using a "limited" nuclear warhead to destroy Guilala. Meanwhile, President Sorkozy (sic) of France has finally bedded the translator, who confesses her true identity. Clad only in a towel, Sorkozy creates a distraction, which allows Japanese soldiers to rush the spies. The North Country leader is captured but not before managing to launch the nuclear missile at Guilala. Dr. Sano announces that Guilala's spores are re-energized and that if the missile strikes, it will spread Guilala spores worldwide.

Meanwhile, two Japanese journalists named Sumire Sumidagawa and Sanpei Toyama discover a hidden village full of worshipers. They are driven out as outsiders intruding on a sacred ceremony. Shortly afterwards, Guilala lands and begins searching for energy. Sumire and Sanpei are sent to get news on Guilala's rampage. However, their efforts prove unsuccessful, as other news groups are looking for big news on Guilala. During the G8 Summit's efforts to stop Guilala, Sumire encounters a boy she saw at the village's ceremony. Believing that the village might know how to stop Guilala, Sumire and Sanpei return for answers.

They find a carving of Guilala which they also notice is battling another monster. That figure is known as Take-Majin, a deity that the villagers worship. An ancient prophecy predicted that Guilala was going to destroy the world, but he would be stopped by Take-Majin, who would awaken to save mankind from Guilala. The little boy Sumire met earlier worshiped Take-Majin, after his father was killed in a landslide. Concerned with the planet's safety over their own, Sumire and a reluctant Sanpei participate in Take-Majin's awakening ceremony. Just when Take-Majin is about to wake up, the entire village is evacuated by the army when the nuclear missile launched by North Country begins to approach Guilala.

Just in time, Take-Majin suddenly awakens and stops the missile by catching it with his buttocks, allowing it to explode inside his body harmlessly. He then confronts Guilala, preparing for battle. After a long battle, Take-Majin is victorious, decapitating Guilala and saving all humanity as prophesied. Take-Majin then returns into his shrine to sleep once again. The G8 Summit leaders celebrate their victory by taking a bath in a hot spring (despite the Supreme leader of the North Country escaping during the fight).

Cast 

 Natsuki Kato as Sumire
 Kazuki Kato as Senpei
 Akira Matsushita as Former Prime Minister Junzaburo OhiZuma 
 Matabee Watabe as
 Jon Heese as U.S. President Earth Burger
 Anatoli Krasnov as Russian President Beef Stroganuf Putchin
 Inge Murata as Bundeskanzlerin Angela Merkel
 Ingo as Former President Escalugo Solkozi
 Roberto Corassanti as Italian Prime Minister Pizzano Pietro
 Wayne Doster as British Prime Minister Master Pie Brightman
 Ricaya Spooner as KGB
 Ziko Uchiyama as Northern Dictator 
 Shoken Kunimoto as 
 Yakan Nabe as 
 Kon Arimura as Announcer 
 Kei Akazawa as Translator
 Hikari Nagase as Translator 
 Haruka Inoue as Translator 
 Maiko Kawamura as Translator
 Rei Natsumi as Translator 
 Emi Ota as Translator 
 Yuri Morishita as Translator
 Shun'ya Wazaki as
 Lily Franky as 
 Namoru Abe as Villager 
 Susumu Kurobe as Officer Kimura 
 Masami Horiuchi as
 Bin Furuya as Officer Takamine 
 Eiichi Kikuchi as Mayor Makichi
 Hurricane Ryu as Guilala
 Takeshi Kitano as Take-Majin

Reaction

When released at G-Fest, XVI the film received mostly good reviews. Fans felt the film was entertaining because it did not take itself seriously, since it was a comedic melodrama. However, some fans were disappointed that many sequences of Guilala in the film (Guilala's rampage on Sapporo, Guilala's attack on the power plant and almost every scene of Guilala shooting fireballs) were nothing more than stock footage recycled from the original film.

DVD release
Monster X Strikes Back: Attack the G8 Summit was released in North America on DVD on June 30, 2009 by Media Blasters. The special features are a photo gallery and Tokyo Shock trailers.

References

External links
 
 ギララの逆襲／洞爺湖サミット危機一発公式サイト 
 

2008 films
2008 comedy films
Films about fictional presidents of the United States
Films set in 2008
Films directed by Minoru Kawasaki
Films set in Sapporo
Films set in the United States
Films set in the United Kingdom
Films set in France
Films set in Italy
Films set in Germany
Films set in Canada
Films set in Russia
Films set in North Korea
Japanese sequel films
Kaiju films
North Korea in fiction
Japanese satirical films
Japanese political satire films
Shochiku films
2000s Japanese films